The Architects of Guilt is the second full-length album by the death metal band The Famine released the February 15, 2011 via Solid State Records. It is the follow-up to their debut The Raven and the Reaping (2008).

Development

Early stages
After the departure of vocalist Kris McCaddon on January 9, 2010, bassist Nick Nowell took over vocals, and bass duties were quickly filled by new addition Jon Richardson as announced on the 15th.
On February 26, the band announced that their studio burned down with all of their materials for their new album.
Bassist Jon Richardson explains: "The Architects of Guilt is not a sing-a-long or a feel good record; it’s the death rattle and dying breath.The Famine is not here to win popularity contests, simply create metal, red in tooth and claw." and “The music has become faster, more technical, even abrasive and discomforting, trading sheer aggression and energy for the lifeless sweeps and mechanized beats that have come to dominate and dilute the genre. The lyrics forego empty threats and skip the subtleties, calling out the deceit and duplicity of our leaders, and the decay next door masked by a flaking white picket fence and a familiar chemical scent.”
The album cover and the track list were revealed on 23 December 2010.
The Famine have made 6 behind the scenes footage from the making of the album, the first was the 23rd December 2010 while the last one was posted the 14th February 2011.

Production
The Architects of Guilt was produced by D. Braxton Henry (Ex- Devourment) and mixed by Jason Suecof (Mutiny Within, The Black Dahlia Murder, Trivium, Charred Walls of the Damned).

Album cover
Vocalist Nick Nowell explains about the album cover saying: "I talked to Ryan Clark about the lyrical theme being very uncomfortable and discussing human nature without delving into metal clichés like satan and gore. Ryan is a guy who knows metal and who knows the art world, so he was the perfect guy for this job. He came back with a concept that is not blasphemous, but is uneven and uncomfortable. You look at it and you want to look away, but you aren’t exactly sure why. If I wanted to take it this far, I could say that the image on the cover represents the hideous architect of guilt within each of us. It’s ugly and it’s crystal clear.".

Promotion and release
A number of tracks were released to promote the album: "Ad Mortem", "VII The Fraudulent", "A Fragile Peace", "The Crown and the Holy See"; and the music video for the first single "Ad Mortem" was released the 9th February.

Track list

Lyrics: Nick Nowell, except “We are the Wolves” by Andrew Forbus, music: The Famine

Personnel 

Nick Nowell – vocals
Andrew Godwin – guitar
Mark Garza – drums
Jonny "Christmas" Richardson – bass
D. Braxton Henry – production
Ryan Clark – artwork
Jason Suecof – mixing

References

External links 
 The Famine - "The Architects Of Guilt" - BANDSONFIRE | Christ-centered Hardcore/Metal/Emo/Punk/Alternative/Rock/Indie/HipHop & more
 The Architects Of Guilt : Theprp.com
 Myspace
 Allmusic

2011 albums
Solid State Records albums